In an attempt to develop the French Congo the government of France divided the territory in concessions for companies to develop.  These several dozen companies controlled huge swaths of land, but had only limited success in trying to develop them. Most were merged into several larger companies that were more strictly controlled by the state after the French Congo was dissolved in 1906.

List of companies
With the size of their concessions in km2.
Société agricole et commerciale de du Bas-Ogooué, 1200
Société brettone du Congo, 2000
Compagnie du Bavili-M'Banio, 2800
Société de l'Ogooué-N'Gouiné, 3350
Société coloniale du Baniembé, 3600
Compagnie franco-congolaise de la Sangha, 3800
Société de la K'Keni et N'Kémé, 3950
Société des factoreries de N'Ddjolé, 4200
Compagnie de la Sangha, 5300
Société de la Sangha équatoriale, 5490
Société commerciale coloniale de la Mamberé-Sangha, 5600
Société commerciale et agricole de la Kadéï-Sangha, 6500
Compagnie française de l'Oubanghi-Ombella, 7000
Compagnie de la Haute-N'Gounié, 7100
Société de l'Ekela-Sangha, 7800
Compagnie de la Mobaye, 8000
Société de l'Ongomo, 8200
Société de l'Afrique française, 9350
Compagnie commerciale de Colonisation du Congo français, 12,400
Société de la Kadéï-Sangha, 12,900
Société de la Haut-Sangha, 13,050
Compagnie agricole et coloniale et industrielle de la Léfini, 13,700
Compagnie de la N'Goko Ouesso, 14,000
Compagnie du Kouango français, 15,000
Société de l'Ibenga, 15,000
Compagnie du Kouango-Oubanghi, 15,300
Société des établissments Gratry M'Poko, 16,500
Compagnie générale du Fernand Vaz, 17,300
Compagnie des produits de la Sangha Lipa-Ouesso, 18,000
Société de la Setté Cama, 19,000
Société agricole et commerciale de l'Alima, 20,200
Compagnie française du Congo occidental, 21,700
Compagnie des Caoutchoucs et produits de la Lobay, 32,400
Société de l'Afrique équatorial, 33,850
Compagnie française du Haut-Congo, 36,000
Compagnie française du Congo, 43,000
Société commerciale, industrielle, et agricole, du Haut-Ogooué, 104,000
Société des Sultanats du Haut-Oubanghi, 140,000

Companies of Overseas France